Mark David Leonard (born August 14, 1964) is a former outfielder in Major League Baseball. Between 1990 and 1995 he played for the Baltimore Orioles and the San Francisco Giants.

References

Living people
1964 births
Baltimore Orioles players
San Francisco Giants players
Major League Baseball outfielders
Baseball players from California
UC Santa Barbara Gauchos baseball players
Clinton Giants players
Everett Giants players
Phoenix Firebirds players
Rochester Red Wings players
Salt Lake Buzz players
Shreveport Captains players
Tri-Cities Triplets players
People from Mountain View, California